The Coimbatore Diocese is one of the 24 dioceses of the Anglican Church of South India (CSI).

Office Bearers of the Diocese 
President = Rt.Rev. Timothy Ravinder Dev Pradeep

Vice President = Rev. Jacob Livingston 

Hon Secretary = Rev. Prince Calvin

Hon Treasurer = Mr. Amirtham (A-1 )

History of the Diocese 
Antony Watson Brough (1861-1936), a missionary who came to Coimbatore from Australia in 1894, has played a major role in the history of the Diocese, served at Coimbatore for two years, moved to Erode in 1897 and established a hospital in Erode, particularly to look after the health needs of Muslim women. Though the hospital is now called CSI Hospital, it is popularly known as Gosh Hospital. It is next to the church, named in his memory, on Brough Road. He also set up one more hospital in Chennimalai, in memory of his son, who died on the battlefront during World War I. In all, Brough established 94 schools in and around Erode and two hospitals.

The diocese was formed at Brough Memorial Church, Erode, on 27 September 1950.

About the Diocese 
CSI Coimbatore Diocese is the largest in terms of area, covering the Nilgiri, Coimbatore, Erode, Salem, Namakkal, Dharmapuri and Krishnagiri.
 
The diocese has 105 pastorates, 112 pastors and a membership of 150,000.

Bishops of Coimbatore CSI Diocese 
 Aiyadurai Jesudasen Appasamy (1950-1959) 
 S J Samuel
 Jeevaanandam Thangamuthu
 William Moses
 Manickam Dorai (2000-2010)
 Timothy Ravinder Dev Pradeep (2013– ...)

Cathedral and other major CSI churches in the diocese

Coimbatore

CSI Immanuel Church, Avinashi Road, Coimbatore
CSI Immanuel church is the cathedral church of the diocese. The church is one among the oldest churches in Coimbatore  built in the year of 1830. The church is located in Avinashi road at Gopalapuram. The church underwent a major renovation work in the year 2006.

All Soul's Church, Race Course, Gopalapuram, Coimbatore
Between 1863 and 1869, 8.5 acres were acquired from Anga Naicken and Rangaswamy Gounder in Race Course, at a total cost of Rs. 1488. Prison Superintendent James Grimes and Survey Superintendent Colonel Hessey supervised the construction which began in 1866. In less than Rs. 20,000, All Souls' was built and furnished. The All Soul's Church was consecrated for worship on 27 January 1872 by Gell and Henry Pope was the first resident Chaplin. The church is a successor of the seventeenth century All Souls' Anglican Chapel.

Cruciform shaped chancels accommodate the choir on side and the congregation on the other. The chancels have a low wooden roof, double sided gabled entrances supported by a single column and two pointed arches. The arch openings lead to a 12 feet wide hall culminating in the raised sanctuary. A king post truss supports the steep tiled timber rafter roof. The roof has an intricate woodwork with the lower beams of the truss ending in cross shapes. The walls are of Ashlar masonry and the windows are made of exquisite stained glass. A porch was added at the western end in 1902, in memory of King Edward VII.

CSI Christ Church, Coimbatore
The foundation was laid on 15 October 1898 by Frederick Gell, Bishop of Madras and the church was dedicated on 11 June 1910. The church was extended in the year 1970.
Christ Church, Coimbatore

Nilgiris
St. Stephen's Church, Ooty
St. Stephen's Church is located on the road to Mysore in Ooty and it is one of the oldest churches in the Nilgiris district.
Wesley Church, Coonoor
 C.S.I WEesley Church Hulical Pastorate, Glendale Estate, CoonoorSalemChrist Church, SalemChrist Church is located on Fort Road, near the District Collectorate, in the heart of Salem City, Tamil Nadu, India. The church has been serving the community for the last 140 years, since its consecration in 1875. The church services at Christ Church are conducted both in English and Tamil. The church was designed by architect Robert Fellowes Chisholm, who was a pioneer of the Indo-Saracenic architecture, and also designed the Senate House buildings of the University of Madras and the Madras Presidency CollegeC.S.I. Nathaniel Memorial Church, Sankagiri, SalemOthersCSI Brough Memorial Church, Erode'''
The construction of the church started in 1930 and it was completed in the year 1933 by Antony Watson Brough. The church was dedicated in 1933 by Vedanayagam Samuel Azariah. Built with lime mortar with egg and the stones were brought from Karur, it is constructed in the Indo-Saracenic style architecture.
 CSI St. Johns Church, at Kosavampalayam Road, Palladam
 CSI Yesu Ratchagar Church, Kangayam
 C.S.I Christ Church, Krishnagiri
 CSI Christ Church Mettur Main road Bhavani
 It is one of the main churches established by the London mission.once it belonged to the SIUC.

Educational institutions in the Diocese 
Arts & Science Colleges
Bishop Appasamy College of Arts and Science
Bishop Appasamy College of Education
Engineering College
CSI College of Engineering, Ketti 
Polytechnic College
CSI Polytechnic College, Salem
Technical College
CSI Technical and Vocational Training College for Women, Avinashi Road, Coimbatore 
Teacher Training Institute
CSI Teacher Training Institute for Women, Hasthampatti, Salem
Primary and secondary education
Nursery schools -13
Primary and middle schools -69
High schools -5
Higher secondary Schools -10
Matriculation schools-3
Matriculation higher secondary schools
CSI Boys Higher Secondary School (Formerly Known as London Mission High School & Union High School), Coimbatore 
CSI Girls Higher Secondary School, Coimbatore
CSI CMM Higher Secondary School, Ooty
Kindergarten teacher training 
Kindergarten Teacher Training Institute, Gopalapuram, Coimbatore

Medical institutions in the Diocese 
 Hospitals
CSI Kosha Hospital, Erode.
Herbert Brough Memorial Hospital, Chennimalai.

 School of Nursing
CSI School of Nursing, Erode.

See also 
Anglican 
 Church of South India
 Trichy-Tanjore Diocese
 Tirunelveli Diocese
 Madurai-Ramnad Diocese
 Diocese of Madras
General and other denominations
 Christianity in Tamil Nadu
 Roman Catholic Diocese of Coimbatore
 Christianity in India

References

External links 

CSI Christ Church Coimbatore
CSI Synod
CSI Teacher Training Institute for Women

1950 establishments in Madras State
Coimbatore
Christianity in Tamil Nadu
Coimbatore
Coimbatore district
Dharmapuri district
Erode district
Krishnagiri district
Namakkal district
Nilgiris district
Christian organizations established in 1950
Salem district